is a Japanese volleyball player. He competed in the men's tournament at the 1988 Summer Olympics.

References

1961 births
Living people
Japanese men's volleyball players
Olympic volleyball players of Japan
Volleyball players at the 1988 Summer Olympics
Sportspeople from Tokyo